Trevor Schumm (born c. 1967) is a Canadian-Australian curler and baseball coach and scout.

At the international level, he is a  curler; the team, skipped by Hugh Millikin represented Australia at the 1998 World Men's Curling Championships.

Schumm grew up on a farm near Spruce Grove, Alberta. He played baseball, ice hockey and Canadian football in his youth, and was the quarterback of his high school's football team. He then played junior college baseball at Allan Hancock College,  played in spring training for the California Angels, and both played and coached at Cornell University.  The returned to Alberta to coach there, and then moved to Australia in 1995, taking a job with the Australian Capital Territory academy of sport, and worked as a youth baseball coach. In 2000, he coached the Australian team at the World Junior Baseball Championship. There, he was involved in a brawl between the Australian and Cuban teams, and was kicked out of the tournament by the International Baseball Federation.

In 2008, he became a scouting coordinator for the San Diego Padres.

Schumm  comes from a football family. His father Howie and uncle Herb played for the Edmonton Eskimos and the Calgary Stampeders.

Teams and events

References

External links

Living people
Sportspeople from Sydney
Australian male curlers
Pacific-Asian curling champions

1960s births
Curlers from Edmonton
Canadian emigrants to Australia
Canadian baseball players
People from Spruce Grove
Cornell Big Red baseball players
Cornell Big Red baseball coaches
Canadian baseball coaches
Allan Hancock Bulldogs baseball players
San Diego Padres scouts